Garren Lake may refer to:

Garrensee, lake in Switzerland
Garren Stitt (often credited as Garren Lake; born 2003), American actor